Matt Browne may refer to:
 Matt Browne (speedway rider) (born 1983), American motorcycle speedway rider
 Matt Browne (hurler) (born 1942), former hurling player of Wexford GAA

See also 
Matt Brown (disambiguation)